Sandeep Lamichhane (born 2 August 2000) is a Nepalese cricketer who captained the Nepalese national team, He is widely regarded as one of the best spinners of his generation and greatest spinners Nepal has ever produced. 

A right-arm leg spin bowler, Lamichhane has played for Twenty20 franchise sides across the world, including the Delhi Capitals in the Indian Premier League (IPL), the Hobart Hurricanes in the Big Bash League (BBL), and the Lahore Qalandars in the Pakistan Super League (PSL). He is also Nepal's all-time highest wicket taker in ODIs as well as in T20Is.

Lamichhane made his Twenty20 International (T20I) debut against the West Indies, where he represented a World XI side. He became the first cricketer to make a T20 international debut representing a combined team. Lamichhane was one of the eleven cricketers to play in Nepal's first One Day International (ODI) match, against the Netherlands, in August 2018. In December 2021, Lamichhane was named as the captain of Nepal's national team, replacing Gyanendra Malla.

Early and personal life
Sandeep Lamichhane was born on 2 August 2000 in Aruchaur, Syangja, Gandaki Province. During his childhood, he considered Sachin Tendulkar and Shane Warne as his cricketing idols. Then he moved to Chitwan district and started training at Chitwan Cricket Academy which is run by former captain Raju Khadka. During a visit by the captain Paras Khadka and coach of Nepal Pubudu Dasanayake, Sandeep was told to bowl in the nets and was selected for the national under-19 training camp. It was Pubudu Dasanayake who first spotted his talent when he was a 14 year old kid.

Lamichhane is also a singer. He uploads his songs and music videos in his YouTube channel. In July 2018, Lamichhane released his first song Udash thiyo from the album Pratikshya-the waiting.

Early career
Lamichhane made his List A cricket debut in the 2015–17 ICC World Cricket League Championship on 16 April 2016 against Namibia. Prior to his List A debut, he was named in Nepal's under-19 squad for the 2016 Under-19 Cricket World Cup. In their second match against Ireland under-19s he took a hat-trick, becoming the fifth bowler to take a hat-trick in under-19 world cup history. He was adjudged man of the match with figures of 5/27.

He finished the tournament as second highest wicket taker with 14 wickets at an average of 17.07 and strike rate of 21.9.

He was recruited by former English-born Hong Kong cricketer Scott McKechnie to play for the Kowloon Cantons franchise in the inaugural edition of the Hong Kong T20 Blitz in 2016. Scott was impressed with the youngster's performance during the MCC tour of Nepal in November 2016 where Scott himself was undone by his spin twice in the same match and it prompted Scott McKechnie to scout for Lamichchane for the 2016 Hong Kong Blitz competition. Lamichchane ended up picking seven wickets in the three matches against the touring Marleybone Cricket Club.

The Hong Kong T20 Blitz in fact, went onto become a breakout tournament for Lamichhane himself and it ultimately turned out to be meteoric rise for him in his young days as he was discovered for his bowling display and even went onto share dressing room with World Cup winning captain Michael Clarke during the course of the tournament.

In September 2016, Lamichhane received a letter from former Australian captain Michael Clarke, inviting him to play at the Sydney-based Western Suburbs District Cricket Club. In the 2017 ACC Under-19 Asia Cup, he took bowling figures of 5/8 which restricted Malaysia under-19s to a total of 45 and was named the man of the match.

T20 franchise cricket
In January 2018, Lamichhane was included in the list of players for auction in the 2018 Indian Premier League (IPL). He was bought by Delhi Daredevils and became the first Nepalese cricketer to get a contract in the IPL. Indian Prime minister Narendra Modi commented that the relationship between India and Nepal had been strengthened because of the signing.

In March 2018, he was drafted to play for the St Kitts and Nevis Patriots in the 2018 Caribbean Premier League, and became the first player from Nepal to be selected in the Caribbean Premier League.

In May 2018, Lamichhane made his senior Twenty20 debut for the Delhi Capitals in the Indian Premier League, becoming the first Nepalese cricketer to play in the IPL. He took a wicket for 25 runs on his debut match against Royal Challengers Bangalore. In the tournament, he took five wickets in three matches with a bowling average of 16.40.

In June 2018, Lamichane was selected to play for the Montreal Tigers in the inaugural edition of the Global T20 Canada tournament. In the tournament he took eight wickets in five matches at an average of 19.62. In September 2018, he was named in Nangarhar's squad in the first edition of the Afghanistan Premier League tournament, going on to play in one match in the tournament.

In October 2018, he was signed by the Melbourne Stars for the Big Bash League (BBL), becoming the first cricketer from Nepal to play in the BBL. Later the same month, he was named in the squad for Sylhet Sixers, following the draft for the 2018–19 Bangladesh Premier League. In November 2018, Lamichhane was named in Lahore Qalandars's squad in the fourth edition of the Pakistan Super League. In March 2019, he was named as one of eight players to watch by the International Cricket Council (ICC) ahead of the 2019 Indian Premier League tournament. The following month, Lamichhane said he recognised the huge learning curve of playing in the IPL and that it had "changed his life".

In June 2019, he was selected to play for the Toronto Nationals franchise team in the 2019 Global T20 Canada tournament. In July 2020, he was named in the Jamaica Tallawahs squad for the 2020 Caribbean Premier League. In November 2020, he was signed by the Hobart Hurricanes for the 2020–21 Big Bash League. In March 2021, Lamichhane was signed by Worcestershire to play in the 2021 t20 Blast in England. However, in June 2021, he was denied a work visa for the United Kingdom and was released by Worcestershire. He was also set to play in the inaugural edition of The Hundred in 2021 but he missed out owing to visa issues and was subsequently replaced by Tabraiz Shamsi. In July 2022, he was signed by the Dambulla Giants for the third edition of the Lanka Premier League.

International career

In January 2018, Lamichhane was named in Nepal's squad for the 2018 ICC World Cricket League Division Two tournament. In their opening match against Namibia, he was adjudged man of the match with bowling figures of 4/18 in 8.2 overs. He also shared a crucial final wicket partnership of 18 runs with Basanta Regmi to win the match by one wicket. In the third match against the United Arab Emirates, he took 3/30 to help reduce the opponent to 114 runs. In the fourth match against Kenya, he took his first five wicket haul in List A cricket, with 5/20, and was again named the man of the match.

Lamichhane was awarded with ICC World Cricket League Division Two Player of the tournament award as a result of his economical bowling and took the most wickets in the tournament, taking 17 wickets in six matches.

In February 2018, the International Cricket Council (ICC) named Lamichhane as one of the ten players to watch ahead of the 2018 Cricket World Cup Qualifier tournament. Following the conclusion of the tournament, the ICC went on to name Lamichhane as the rising star of Nepal's squad.

In May 2018, he was added to the ICC Rest of the World XI team, for the Hurricane Relief T20 Challenge against the West Indies at Lord's. He made his T20I debut in the match.

In July 2018, he was named in Nepal's squad for their ODI series against the Netherlands. These were Nepal's first ODI matches after gaining ODI status during the 2018 Cricket World Cup Qualifier. Ahead of the matches, the ICC named him as the key player for Nepal. He made his T20I debut for Nepal in July in the third match of the 2018 MCC Tri-Nation Series, against the Netherlands. He made his ODI debut for Nepal against the Netherlands on 1 August 2018.

In August 2018, he was named in Nepal's squad for the 2018 Asia Cup Qualifier tournament. In October 2018, he was named in Nepal's squad in the Eastern sub-region group for the 2018–19 ICC World Twenty20 Asia Qualifier tournament. He was the leading wicket-taker during the tournament, with 24 dismissals in six matches.

In June 2019, he was named in Nepal's squad for the Regional Finals of the 2018–19 ICC T20 World Cup Asia Qualifier tournament. He made his first-class debut on 6 November 2019, for Nepal against the Marylebone Cricket Club (MCC), during the MCC's tour of Nepal. On 12 February 2020, in the match against the United States in the 2020 Nepal Tri-Nation Series, Lamichhane took his first five-wicket haul in an ODI match. His career best figures of 6/16 restricted USA to joint lowest ever total in ODI history for 35. On 29 February 2020, in the match against Malaysia in the Eastern Region group of the 2020 Asia Cup Qualifier, Lamichhane became the first bowler for Nepal to take 100 wickets in Twenty20 cricket. In September 2020, he was one of eighteen cricketers to be awarded with a central contract by the Cricket Association of Nepal.

On 11 October 2021, Lamichhane was named the ICC Player of the Month by the International Cricket Council.

In December 2021, Lamichhane was announced as new captain of the Nepal national team by the Cricket Association of Nepal (CAN) after Gyanendra Malla was sacked due to disciplinary issues, along with former vice-captain Dipendra Singh Airee.

Rape allegations
A police complaint was filed by a 17-year-old girl, on 6 September 2022, accusing Lamichhane of raping her on the night of 21 August in a hotel room in Kathmandu. Police confirmed that the CCTV footage of the hotel revealed Lamichhane was staying with the girl. On 8 September, Kathmandu District Court authorised the arrest of Lamichhane for further investigation. During when the arrest warrant was issued against him, he was due to take part in the 2022 Caribbean Premier League representing Jamaica Tallawahs. Soon after the news broke out regarding his rape allegations, he pulled out of Caribbean Premier League but denied any wrongdoing. Consequently, Nepal's cricket governing body, Cricket Association of Nepal (CAN) suspended Lamichhane from the national team. Police in Nepal issued a diffusion notice through Interpol against Lamichhane. As a result of the notice, Lamichhane was added to the Interpol police fugitive list.

Lamichhane turned himself in to Nepal police on 6 October 2022 and was taken to the Gaushala, Kathmandu jail. Later Kathmandu District Court sent Lamichhane to Central Jail Sundhara for judicial custody until the final verdict.however Lamichhane, who has been accused of raping a minor, was released after posting a bail of Rs2 million set by the Patan High Court.

Responding to a review petition filed by Lamichhane, a joint bench of judges Dhruva Raj Nanda and Ramesh Dahal on Thursday had ordered the release of the suspended cricketer on a bail with conditions. Lamichhane was released by Patan High court on January 13, 2023 followed by a bail of NPR 2 Million. After release, sandeep was back in Nepalese cricket team, when CAN lifted his suspension. On February 24, 2023 sandeep's application of visiting abroad to play for the nepal cricket team was refused by the court. Later, on February 27th Supreme court permitted permission to visit abroad by changing their decision.

Honours
 NNIPA Best Youth Player of the Year: 2017
 NCCS-CPAN Cricketer of the Year: 2018
 ICC Men's Player of the Month for September 2021

References

External links
 

2000 births
Living people
Nepalese cricketers
Nepal One Day International cricketers
Nepal Twenty20 International cricketers
World XI Twenty20 International cricketers
People from Syangja District
Delhi Capitals cricketers
Jamaica Tallawahs cricketers
Lahore Qalandars cricketers
Melbourne Stars cricketers
Nangarhar Leopards cricketers
St Kitts and Nevis Patriots cricketers
Sylhet Strikers cricketers
21st-century Nepalese male singers
Hobart Hurricanes cricketers
People from Chitwan District